Clarke International University, formerly International Health Sciences University, is a private non-residential university in Uganda.

Location
Clarke has built its main campus at Kawagga Close, off Kalungi Road, Muyenga at Block 224 | Plot 8244 Bukasa, Kyadondo, from St. Barnabas Road, Namuwongo a southeastern section of Kampala, Uganda's capital and largest city. The coordinates of the university campus are:0°17'32.0"N 32°37'30.0"E (Latitude:0.292222; Longitude:32.625000. The university has an annex on campus, that is located at St. Agnes Academy, Muwayire Road, Kisugu, Kampala, Uganda, at geographical coordinates: 0°18'21.5"N 32°36'29.5"E (Latitude:0.305972; Longitude:32.608194.

Overview
Clarke International University is a member of the Clarke Group of Companies (Clarke Group), a conglomerate of companies in agribusiness, healthcare, education, hospitality, leisure and philanthropy. The companies in the group are majority owned by physician, politician, entrepreneur and philanthropist Dr Ian Clarke.

The university incorporated the Uganda Health Management Institute (UHMI), and the International Hospital School of Nursing (IHSON) as the two founding faculties of the university. In December 2010, the university marked its maiden graduation ceremony, held at the university campus at Namuwongo, a suburb of Kampala. In March 2014, the university held its fourth graduation ceremony, where 229 students graduated, of whom 111 (48%) were male and 118 (52%) were female.

History
The university admitted the first class of students in August 2008. The chancellor of the university is Bishop Zac Niringiye. The vice chancellor is Dr. Nanyonga Rose Clarke. The chairman of the University Council is Dr. Moses Galukande. Dr. Ian Clarke, the founder of the university, was a member of the University Council until he relinquished that responsibility in 2010. The current members of the council are listed at the university's webpage.

Schools and institutes
, the university had one institute and three functional schools:
 Institute of Health Policy and Management
 School of Nursing
 School of Allied Health Sciences
 School of Business and Applied Technology.

Courses
Courses can be pursued (a) full-time (b) part-time (c) on-campus or (d) via remote e-learning. The following academic courses are offered at the university:

Postgraduate degree courses
 MSc Health Services Management
 MSc Public Health 
 Master of Public Health

Undergraduate degree courses
 BBA Health Management
 BSc Public Health
  Bachelor of Nursing Science (BNSc)
 Bachelors in Medical Laboratory Science (BMLS)

Diploma courses
 Diploma Public Health
 Diploma Clinical Medicine & Community Health

Certificate courses
 Ethics and Integrity in Healthcare
 Health Law and Regulations
 Health Communication: Theory and Practice
 Population, Poverty, and Health
 Health and Development
 Gender, Health, and Development
 Healthcare Management and Administration
 Refugee Health Management
 Strategic Planning and Management for Healthcare Organizations
 Quality Management in a Healthcare Setting
 Human Resource Management for Health
 Health Economics for Developing Countries
 Health Policy Analysis
 Healthcare Accounting

See also
 International Medical Group
 International Hospital Kampala
 Ian Clarke (physician)
 Education in Uganda
 List of universities in Uganda
 List of medical schools in Uganda
 List of university leaders in Uganda

References

External links
   IHSU Homepage 

 
Educational institutions established in 2008
Education in Kampala
Makindye Division
Medical schools in Uganda
Schools of public health
Business schools in Uganda
2008 establishments in Uganda